Anopinella macrosema is a species of moth of the family Tortricidae. It is found in Costa Rica.

The length of the forewings is 9.9–12 mm, making it one of the largest species in the genus.

External links
Systematic revision of Anopinella Powell (Lepidoptera: Tortricidae: Euliini) and phylogenetic analysis of the Apolychrosis group of genera

Anopinella
Moths of Central America
Moths described in 2003